Nathalie Marie Andrée Baye (born 6 July 1948) is a French film, television and stage actress. She began her career in 1970 and has appeared in more than 80 films. A ten-time César Award nominee, her four wins were for Every Man for Himself (1980), Strange Affair (1981), La Balance (1982), and The Young Lieutenant (2005). In 2009, she was made a Chevalier of the Legion of Honour. Her other films include Day for Night (1973), Catch Me If You Can (2002), Tell No One (2006) and The Assistant (2015).

Early life
Baye was born in Mainneville, Eure, Normandy, to Claude Baye and Denise Coustet, two painters. At 14, she joined a school of dance in Monaco. Three years later she went to the United States. On returning to France she continued with dance but also registered for the Simon Course and was admitted to the Conservatoire, from where she graduated in 1972 with a second prize in comedy, dramatic comedy and foreign theatre.

Career
Her second cinema appearance was in Two People (1973) directed by Robert Wise. She became better known as the script girl in Day for Night (La Nuit américaine, 1973) by François Truffaut. Throughout the 1970s, she played the good girlfriend or nice provincial girl in film and television.

She won her first César, as best supporting artist, for Every Man for Himself (Sauve qui peut (la vie), 1980) directed by Jean-Luc Godard. There then followed The Return of Martin Guerre (Le Retour de Martin Guerre, 1982) and La Balance (also 1982).

Baye won two more César Awards, Best Supporting Actress, for Strange Affair (Une étrange affaire, 1981), and Best Actress for La Balance, 1982). Her four-year relationship with Johnny Hallyday made them a celebrity couple and their daughter is Laura Smet, now an actress.

After changing her image by playing a streetwalker in La Balance, she widened her scope with more obscure characters in J'ai épousé une ombre (1983) and En toute innocence (1988). In 1986, she returned to the theatre with an interpretation of Adriana Monti.

In 1999, she was voted Best Supporting Actress at Venice Film Festival for Une liaison pornographique and starred in Vénus Beauté (Institut) (2000) by Tonie Marshall which won multiple César Awards including Best Film.

She has worked with Claude Chabrol and Steven Spielberg.

Filmography

Awards and nominations

References

External links 

 
 
 

1948 births
Living people
20th-century French actresses
21st-century French actresses
French National Academy of Dramatic Arts alumni
French film actresses
French stage actresses
French television actresses
Best Actress César Award winners
Best Supporting Actress César Award winners
Chevaliers of the Légion d'honneur
Magritte Award winners
Volpi Cup for Best Actress winners
People from Eure